Kantheredu Nodu is a 1961 Indian Kannada-language film, directed by T. V. Singh Thakur and produced by A. K. Velan. The film stars Rajkumar, Leelavathi, Balakrishna and Rajasree. The film has musical score by G. K. Venkatesh.

The movie was remade in Malayalam in 1965 as Kavyamela and the producer of Kantheredu Nodu, A. K. Velan, subsequently remade it in Tamil in 1968 as Devi, starring R. Muthuraman and Devika.

A. K. Velan had sold the copyrights of the Kannada movie to Malayalam producer T. E. Vasudevan for Rs.1000. Subsequently, he purchased it back for Rs.5000 to remake it in Tamil for a 1968 movie titled  Devi, which bombed at the box office.

Cast

Rajkumar as Gopanna
Leelavathi
Balakrishna as Dasanna
Rajasree
Narasimharaju
B. Ramadevi
G. V. Iyer
M. Jayashree
Bharadwaj
Papamma
Eshwarappa
Vijayakumari
Ganapathi Bhat
Vasanthi
H. Krishna Shastry
Kuppuraj
Veerabhadrappa
Revathi
Shakunthala

Soundtrack
The music was composed by G. K. Venkatesh.

References

External links
 
 

1961 films
1960s Kannada-language films
Films scored by G. K. Venkatesh
Kannada films remade in other languages